Andrius Zakarauskas (born 1982) is a painter from Lithuania.

Biography 
Zakarauskas was born and raised in Kaunas, later studied in Vilnius Academy of Arts. Since 2005 he held solo shows in Lithuania as well as abroad.

Work

Awards 
In 2009 he won the competition of "Young Painter Prize" in Lithuania.

References 

Lithuanian painters
Vilnius Academy of Arts alumni
1982 births
Living people